Czech Republic competed at the 2014 Winter Paralympics in Sochi, Russia, held between 7–16 March 2014.

Alpine skiing

Men

Snowboarding

Para-snowboarding is making its debut at the Winter Paralympics and it will be placed under the Alpine skiing program during the 2014 Games.

Men

Ice sledge hockey

Team
Jiri Berger
Erik Fojtik
Michal Geier
Zdenek Habl
Miroslav Hrbek
Libor Hulin
Zdenek Krupicka
Pavel Kubes
Tomas Kvoch
David Motycka
David Palat
Jiri Raul
Zdenek Safranek
Michal Vapenka

Preliminaries

5–8 Classification Play-offs

5th Place Game

See also
Czech Republic at the Paralympics
Czech Republic at the 2014 Winter Olympics

References

Nations at the 2014 Winter Paralympics
2014
Winter Paralympics